1,6-Methano[10]annulene (also known as 1,6-methanonaphthalene or homonaphthalene) is an aromatic hydrocarbon with chemical formula CH.  It was the first stable aromatic compound based on the cyclodecapentaene system to be discovered.

Preparation 
According to Organic Syntheses, it can be prepared from naphthalene.

Aromaticity 
It is analogous to cyclodecapentaene ([10]annulene), but with two hydrogen atoms replaced by a transannular methylene bridge (--). Consequently, it obeys Hückel's rule (n = 2) and despite the distortion from planarity introduced by the methylene bridge, the compound is aromatic.  In fact, when prepared by Vogel in the 1960s it was the first stable aromatic cyclodecapentaene to be discovered.  Its aromaticity is confirmed by three main pieces of evidence.  Firstly, the similarity in carbon-carbon bond lengths as measured by x-ray crystallography is inconsistent with alternating single and double bonds.  The actual structure is better considered as a pair of resonance hybrids (like the Kekulé structures of benzene) rather than as having alternating single and double bonds.

Secondly, its H NMR spectrum displays influence of the diamagnetic ring current which is characteristic of aromatic compounds.  The peripheral protons around the ring are deshielded while the methylene bridge nuclei are strongly shielded.

Its resonance energy is smaller than that of naphthalene.

See also 
 Homoaromaticity
 Cyclodecapentaene
 1,5-Methano[10]annulene

References 

Aromatic hydrocarbons
Non-benzenoid aromatic carbocycles